Trần Văn Nên (born 6 August 1927) is a former Vietnamese cyclist. He competed in the individual road race, individual pursuit, 1000m time trial and team time trial events at the 1964 Summer Olympics.

References

External links
 

1927 births
Possibly living people
Vietnamese male cyclists
Olympic cyclists of Vietnam
Cyclists at the 1964 Summer Olympics
Place of birth missing (living people)
Asian Games medalists in cycling
Cyclists at the 1958 Asian Games
Medalists at the 1958 Asian Games
Asian Games bronze medalists for Vietnam